Hypochrosis binexata is a moth of the family Geometridae first described by Francis Walker in 1863. It is found in Borneo, Peninsular Malaysia, Sumatra and Thailand.

Larvae have been reared on Theobroma cacao.

External links

Hypochrosini
Ennominae
Moths of Borneo